The Edinburgh Tram inquiry is a public inquiry that is being held in Edinburgh to establish why the Edinburgh Trams project incurred delays, cost more than originally budgeted and delivered significantly less than was projected. Due to the long delay and mounting costs, the Inquiry has been accused of turning into a "bigger scandal than the one it was set up to look into in the first place".

Timetable
No time frame has been set for how long the inquiry will take.

On 5 June 2014, First Minister Alex Salmond announced a non-statutory public inquiry. On 12 June 2014 Scottish Parliament were told that the inquiry would be headed by the former Lord Advocate, Andrew Hardie, Baron Hardie. The Scottish Government subsequently announced on 7 November 2014 that the inquiry was to be upgraded to a statutory inquiry to ensure that key personnel would provide evidence. The Solicitor for the Inquiry, is Gordon McNicoll and Senior Counsel is Jonathan Lake QC.

The first preliminary hearing took place on 6 October 2015. It had been set back by a few weeks after Lord Hardie had a short unexpected stay in hospital.

Anticipating some complexity around legal representation of the parties involved, Lord Hardie asked core participants to consider what conflicts of interest might exist and provide written responses to the inquiry by 27 November.

On 2 November 2022, over 8 years after its establishment, the inquiry issued warning letters to persons it proposed to make significant or explicit criticism of. Recipients have a right of response, which must be taken into account before the report is published. Publication of the final report may thus be some months away, and well into 2023 at the earliest.

Terms of Reference
The terms of reference for the inquiry are as follows:

 To inquire into the delivery of the Edinburgh Trams project (“the project”), from proposals for the project emerging to its completion, including the procurement and contract preparation, its governance, project management and delivery structures, and oversight of the relevant contracts, in order to establish why the project incurred delays, cost considerably more than originally budgeted for and delivered significantly less than was projected through reductions in scope.
 To examine the consequences of the failure to deliver the project in the time, within the budget and to the extent projected.
 To otherwise review the circumstances surrounding the project as necessary, in order to report to the Scottish Ministers making recommendations as to how major tram and light rail infrastructure projects of a similar nature might avoid such failures in future.

The inquiry team is based in Edinburgh's Waverley Gate building, the capital's former General Post Office.

Core participants
At the first preliminary hearing on 6 October 2015, Lord Hardie revealed that the parties who had applied for and been granted core participant status were: Bilfinger Construction UK, Carillion Utility Services, Edinburgh City Council, DLA Piper Scotland, Parsons Brinckerhoff, Scottish Ministers and Siemens.

The city council had decided not to revive its former arms-length transport firm Transport Initiatives Edinburgh (Tie), therefore the former company could not be designated a core participant.

Evidence
It was initially estimated that the inquiry might examine more than two million digital files and 200 boxes of documents as evidence.

The hearings made use of large screens, to display documents as they were referred to during the proceedings.

Three expert witnesses gave evidence: Stuart Fair, CIPFA; Bent Flyvbjerg, Professor of Major Programme Management at University of Oxford's Saïd Business School; and David Rumney, consultant in light rail/tramway engineering.

Cost
In August 2015, Edinburgh City Council announced that they expected to spend up to £2million participating in the inquiry. The council spending would include the costs of legal assistance that would be provided to former councillors and staff.

By July 2016, the inquiry itself had cost £3.7m, £1.822m of this being staffing costs, and £716,000 being legal fees.

In June 2020, two years after the last public hearing, the estimated cost had risen to around £11m.

The Scottish Government stated in an FOI request for the remuneration paid to Lord Hardie; 'We are not able to provide details of amounts paid to Lord Hardie under the Data Protection Act'.

Criticism 
Public hearings for the inquiry concluded in 2018 but at November 2022 there is still no date for the publication of the report. Joanna Mowat, a Conservative councillor for Edinburgh city centre, said the delay was “nothing short of a scandal. “No one can understand why this is taking so long”.

References

External links
 

Edinburgh Trams
Light rail in the United Kingdom
Public inquiries in Scotland
Public transport in Scotland
Tram transport in Scotland
Transport in Edinburgh
2014 establishments in Scotland